The Saudi Electronic University, is a Saudi Arabian university that grants both undergraduate and graduate degrees. It was established by royal decree on 8 October 2011 to provide a combination of online and regular education known as blended learning.

In July 2020, Saudi Minister of Education, Hamad bin Mohammed Al Al-Sheikh, appointed Lilac AlSafadi as president of the Saudi Electronic University, to be the first female president of a Saudi university that includes students from both genders.

History
On October 8, 2011, King Abdullah Bin Abdulaziz issued a royal decree to establish the Saudi Electronic University (SEU). This university will use the blended learning methods to offer both graduate and undergraduate degrees. The system of the SEU was built collaboratively with: University of Phoenix, Walden University, Capella University, eCampus Ohio University, Franklin University.

Colleges
 College of Administrative & Financial Sciences (B.Sc., MBA)
 College of Computing and Informatics (B.Sc., M.S in  Information Security, Master in Cyber Security)
 College of Health Sciences (B.Sc.)
 College of Science and theoretical studies (B.Sc.)

References

External links
 Official website 

Universities and colleges in Saudi Arabia
Educational institutions established in 2011
2011 establishments in Saudi Arabia
National universities and colleges in Saudi Arabia